Keros is a rural locality (a settlement) in Ust-Chernovskoye Rural Settlement, Gaynsky District, Perm Krai, Russia. The population was 568 as of 2010. There are 15 streets.

Geography 
Keros is located 146 km northwest of Gayny (the district's administrative centre) by road. Badya is the nearest rural locality.

References 

Rural localities in Gaynsky District